Mutnaya is a rural locality (a village) in Dobryansky District, Perm Krai, Russia. The population was 3 as of 2010. There is 1 street.

Geography 
Mutnaya is located 55 km northeast of Dobryanka (the district's administrative centre) by road. Vilva is the nearest rural locality.

References 

Rural localities in Dobryansky District